Groote Laagte is a village in Ghanzi District of Botswana. It is located close to the Namibian border, north-west of the district capital Ghanzi. Groote Laagte has a primary school and the population was 483 in 2001 census.

"Groote Laagte" is Afrikaans and Dutch for "large lowland" (literally: "great lowth").

References

Ghanzi District
Villages in Botswana